Shi Zhihao (born September 26, 1959) is a male former table tennis player from China. He won several medals in singles, doubles, and team events at the 1980 Asian Table Tennis Championships. He also won a gold medal in the men's team event at the 1981 World Table Tennis Championships.

He was the head coach of the Chinese women's national team. In 2013, he was elected as the vice president of the International Table Tennis Federation.

References

Table tennis players from Shanghai
Living people
1959 births
Chinese male table tennis players
World Table Tennis Championships medalists